Kalasa is a tehsil located in Chikkamagaluru district in Karnataka. Kalasa is home to the Kalaseshwara Temple dedicated to Lord Shiva. Kalasa lies 92 Kilometres South-west of Chickmagalur and is located on the banks of the Bhadra River. Kannada language is spoken here.

Santara dynasty
The history of this region is also associated with the Santara dynasty, a medieval ruling dynasty located in present-day Karnataka, India.

Edgar Thurston mentions that the Santaras were among the powerful Bunt chiefs who seem to have exercised control over a greater part of the Tuluva country before the rise of the Vijayanagara Empire. The Santaras were Jains and had matrimonial relations with the Saivite Alupa royal family of the canara region. The Santaras built a number of Jain monuments and were responsible for the spread of Jainism in the Tulu Nadu and Malenadu region of Karnataka. During this period, the Santara ruler Veera Pandya Bhairarasa erected the monolith of Bahubali in Karkala.

Transport
Kalasa lies amidst Malenadu at a distance of 119 km from Mangalore, 310 km from Bengaluru and 85 km from district headquarters Chikkamagaluru. Horanadu is at a distance of 9 km and Kudremukha National park is at a distance of 23 km from Kalasa.Kalasa can be reached by KSRTC and private buses. Nearest railway station is Chikkamagaluru railway station. The nearest airport is Mangalore International Airport previously known as Bajpe airport situated in Mangalore.

References

External links 

Hindu holy cities
Cities and towns in Chikkamagaluru district
Hill stations in Karnataka
Tourist attractions in Chikkamagaluru district